Nyandungu Urban Wetland Ecotourism park is a 120 hectares of surface area, Rwandan tourism park located between Gasabo and Kicukiro Districts which allows sustainable travel of people to enjoy natural areas and wild animals in Nyandungu Valley. The park was created with essential elements like ornamental ponds, eastern gallery forests, medicinal plant gardens, paved walk ways, restaurants, information center and other recreational services on target of conserving the environment, educating the travelers and  improving the well-being of the local people. It was implemented by Rwanda Environment Management Authority (REMA) in 2020.

History 
The plan to create Nyandungu Urban Wetland Ecotourism park started in 2017 with budget of 5 million Dollars, in beginning REMA counted around 70 species of birds in the park.

Tourism services 
The park was pen official from 8 July 2022 and will welcome visitors seven days a week from 6am-6pm .

There is restaurant service 

They facilitate people in guiding and cycling in the park .

References 

Protected areas of Rwanda
National parks